The Calf House or Druid's Altar is a portal tomb or dolmen in Burren Forest, County Cavan, Ireland. It dates from Neolithic times. It is located close to the Giant's Leap wedge tomb.

References

Notes

Bibliography
 

Tourist attractions in County Cavan
Monuments and memorials in the Republic of Ireland
Dolmens in Ireland
Tombs in the Republic of Ireland